Samuel or Sam Lloyd may refer to:

Samuel T. Lloyd III (born 1950), dean of Washington National Cathedral
Sam Lloyd (1963–2020), American actor and singer
Sam Lloyd (footballer) (born 1990), Australian rules footballer for Western Bulldogs, formerly for Richmond

See also
Sam Loyd (1841–1911), American puzzle author and recreational mathematician